Johannes von Gumpach (1814–1875) was a German-born Englishman who was hired in China to teach astronomy and mathematics.

Von Gumpach was born in Fedderwarden nearby Wilhelmshaven on 7 May 1814 as Johannes Grumbrecht. By 1841 he was recorded as living in the parish of St James, Clerkenwell, in London. In England he adopted the first name Theodor, and in October 1842 he married Jane Willbraham Edwards in Cheltenham, Gloucester, England. While in the employ of the bank Huth & Co he was arrested for embezzlement and sentenced to seven years' exile. He and his wife arrived in Nuremberg on 5 September 1844 using the assumed name "Baron" Johannes von Gumpach. In 1860 he was living in Munich, and from 1860 to 1865 lived in Guernsey in the British Channel Islands, where he wrote copiously to the British astronomical establishment claiming that Newton's "erring imagination" and the acceptance that the Earth was oblate was the cause of maritime disasters. He published scientific writings as a "private scholar".

He was hired by the Tongwen Guan (School of Combined Learning) of the Chinese imperial government, the first modern institution of higher education in China. His dismissal by Robert Hart led him to sue Hart in the British Supreme Court for China and Japan for defamation. In 1873, the case ultimately went to the Judicial Committee of the Privy Council  Hart v Gumpach which upheld Hart's right to make the decision.

In his career, he had written a number of books about the social and economical issues of China.

Von Gumpach died in July 1875 at the General Hospital in Shanghai.

Publications

In German:

References

19th-century German astronomers
19th-century German mathematicians
German emigrants to China
1814 births
1875 deaths